The String Quartet No. 14 in C minor, Op. 131, was completed by Ludwig van Beethoven in 1826. It is the last-composed of a trio of string quartets, written in the order Opp. 132, 130 (with the Große Fuge ending), 131.

It was Beethoven's favourite of the late quartets: he is quoted as remarking to a friend that he would find "a new manner of part-writing and, thank God, less lack of imagination than before". It is said that upon listening to a performance of this quartet Schubert remarked, "After this, what is left for us to write?" Schumann said that this quartet and Op. 127 had a "grandeur ... which no words can express. They seem to me to stand ... on the extreme boundary of all that has hitherto been attained by human art and imagination."

This work is dedicated to Baron  as a gesture of gratitude for taking Beethoven's nephew Karl into the army after a suicide attempt. Beethoven died before the work's publication by Schott Music and before its first performance, the date of which is uncertain.

Music 
About 40 minutes in length, it consists of seven movements played without break:

{| class="wikitable"
|+
!
!style="width: 515px;" |Tempo indication(s)
!Key
!Meter
!Length
|-
|I.
|Adagio ma non troppo e molto espressivo
|style="white-space: nowrap;" | C minor
|style="text-align: center;" | 
|About 7 minutes
|-
|II.
|Allegro molto vivace
|style="white-space: nowrap;" | D major
|style="text-align: center;" | 
|About 3 minutes
|-
|III.
|Allegro moderato – Adagio
|style="white-space: nowrap;" | B minor
|style="text-align: center;" | 
|About 45 seconds
|-
|IV.
|Andante ma non troppo e molto cantabile – Più mosso – Andante moderato e lusinghiero – Adagio – Allegretto – Adagio, ma non troppo e semplice – Allegretto
|style="white-space: nowrap;" | A major
|style="text-align: center;" | 
|About 14 minutes
|-
|V.
|Presto
|style="white-space: nowrap;" | E major
|style="text-align: center;" | 
|about 5 minutes
|-
|VI.
|Adagio quasi un poco andante
|style="white-space: nowrap;" | G minor
|style="text-align: center;" | 
|About 2 minutes
|-
|VII.
|Allegro
|style="white-space: nowrap;" | C minor
|style="text-align: center;" | 
|About 6 minutes
|}
The Op. 131 quartet is a monumental feat of integration. While Beethoven composed the quartet in six distinct key areas, the work begins in C minor and ends in C major. The finale directly quotes the opening fugue theme in the first movement in its second thematic area. This type of cyclical composition was avant-garde for a work of that period. Joseph Kerman wrote: "blatant functional reference to the theme of another movement: this never happens". (It had happened in some other Beethoven works such as the Piano Sonata Op. 101, Cello Sonata Op. 102 No. 1, and the Fifth and Ninth Symphonies; it had even happened before in Joseph Haydn's Forty-Sixth Symphony. Nevertheless, Op. 131 is the first Beethoven work in which the quotation is integrated completely into its new context instead of appearing like an explicit quotation, though even this effect had been anticipated the previous year in the young Felix Mendelssohn's Octet, and much earlier in Christian Latrobe's A major Piano Sonata dedicated to Haydn.)

Op. 131 is often grouped with  132 and 130. There is motivic sharing among the three works. In particular, the "motto" fugue of the leading note rising to the tonic before moving to the minor sixth and then dropping down to the dominant is an important figure shared by these works.

This quartet is one of Beethoven's most elusive works musically. The topic has been written about extensively from very early after its creation, from Karl Holz, the second violinist of the Schuppanzigh Quartet, to Richard Wagner, to contemporary musicologists today. One popular topic is a possible religious/spiritual genesis for this work, supported by similarities to the Missa Solemnis. In the first movement of Op. 131, the continually flowing texture resembles the Benedictus and the Dona Nobis Pacem from the earlier work. In addition, whether purposely or not, Beethoven quotes a motivic figure from Missa Solemnis in the second movement of the quartet.

Five days before Schubert's death, his and Beethoven’s friend Karl Holz, and his string quartet visited to play for him. The last musical work he had wished to hear was the String Quartet No. 14 Op. 131; Holz commented: "The King of Harmony has sent the King of Song a friendly bidding to the crossing."

The piece was featured in the plot of the 2012 film A Late Quartet. It also featured in the Band of Brothers episode "Why We Fight".

Analysis

I. Adagio ma non troppo e molto espressivo 
A fugue based on the following subject, which contains (bars 2–3) the second tetrachord of the harmonic minor scale, the unifying motif of Beethoven's last string quartets:

Richard Wagner said this movement "reveals the most melancholy sentiment expressed in music". Joseph Kerman calls it "this most moving of all fugues". J.W.N. Sullivan (1927, p. 235) hears it as "the most superhuman piece of music that Beethoven has ever written." Philip Radcliffe says "[a] bare description of its formal outline can give but little idea of the extraordinary profundity of this fugue."

II. Allegro molto vivace
A delicate dance in compound duple meter in the key of D major, in compact sonata form based on the following folk-like theme:

III. Allegro moderato – Adagio
In the spirit of recitativo obbligato following the key of B minor; the modulation from B minor to E major functions as a short introduction to the next movement.

IV. Variations
This, the central movement of the quartet, is a set of 7 variations (6 complete and 1 incomplete, with coda) on the following simple theme in A major shared between the first and second violins:

The tempo indications of the variations are: Andante ma non troppo e molto cantabile – Andante moderato e lusinghiero – Adagio – Allegretto – Adagio, ma non troppo e semplice – Allegretto

This movement is the apotheosis of the 'Grand Variation' form from Beethoven's late period.

V. Presto
In E major, this is a brilliant scherzo (though in duple rather than triple time), based on the following simple idea:

Towards the end of the scherzo, there is "an astounding" passage of pianissimo sul ponticello writing for all the instruments, mostly on their highest strings." Joseph Kerman asks "Was this a sound Beethoven had actually heard, back in the days when he was hearing, or did he make up the sound for the first time in 1826? Beethoven deaf was quite capable of 'hearing' or imagining or inventing not only relationships between notes but also sonorities pure and simple."

VI. Adagio quasi un poco andante
In G minor, this movement is in bar form with a coda, which serves as a slow, sombre introduction to the next movement.

VII. Allegro
The finale is in sonata form and returns to the home key of C minor. The first subject has two main ideas:

The violent rhythm in this subject is contrasted with the soaring, lyrical second theme:

References

Sources

External links

 
 Performance by the Orion String Quartet from the Isabella Stewart Gardner Museum in MP3 format
PDF and Finale files of the score of the quartet can be downloaded here.
An account of the relation among Beethoven, his nephew Carl, and the dedicatee Joseph von Stutterheim Further on the circumstances behind the dedication of this quartet.
Commentary by Robert Winter, interviewed by Jason Lopez, on the quartet as it is played, telescoped down to 17 minutes, 31 October 2010
, Alban Berg Quartett
Performance of organ arrangement by Iris Lan on YouTube's music streaming service.

String quartet 14
1826 compositions
Compositions in C-sharp minor
Music dedicated to family or friends